Landolfshausen is a municipality in the district of Göttingen, in Lower Saxony, Germany. One of the constituent villages of the municipality is Falkenhagen.

References

External links
 
Facebook group

Göttingen (district)